Dejavu is the ninth studio album by Japanese singer-songwriter Koda Kumi. It was released on March 2, 2011, one month after her single "Pop Diva". Just like her previous albums, beginning with Best ~first things~ (2005), Dejavu topped the Oricon charts at No. 1 and remained on the charts for twenty-four weeks.

The album was released as a CD and a CD+2DVD combo, the latter of which was only released for a limited time and held the concert Dream Music Park. Once the limited editions sold out, a CD+DVD edition was made public, which omitted the live performance.

Information
Dejavu is Japanese pop-R&B singer Koda Kumi's ninth studio album. It was released a month after her limited released single "Pop Diva". The album peaked at No. 1 on the Oricon Albums Charts and remained on the charts for twenty-four weeks.

Dejavu was released in two editions – a standard CD and first press limited edition CD+2DVD edition, which featured Kumi's performance Dream Music Park. After the CD+2DVD sold out, a CD+DVD version was released, which omitted the performance. The first DVD contained four new music videos and an alternate video of "Pop Diva". "Be My Baby" and "Megumi no Hito" were both given music videos, despite their songs not being placed on the CD. Initially, they were released on Kumi's first cover album Eternity ~Love & Songs~, which had been released in October the previous year.

The album featured American singer-songwriter and producer Brandon Howard (known as B. Howard), who was featured in the song "Passing By," though he was not credited on the track listing on the back of the album covers.

On the first DVD of the CD+2DVD editions, after the music videos, the first half of Kumi's Dream music park at Yokohama Stadium played with the second DVD housing the second half. Once the CD+2DVD editions sold out and the CD+DVD editions became available, only the music videos were available on the DVD.

The album was certified platinum by the RIAJ after its release.

Packaging
Dejavu was released in three editions:

CD: contains fifteen musical tracks.
CD+DVD: contains fifteen musical tracks and nine music videos.
CD+2DVD: contains fifteen musical tracks, nine music videos and Kumi's Dream Music Park concert.

The CD+2DVD was of limited release, with only a certain number of copies produced. Once all of the 2DVD copies were sold, a CD+DVD version was available. The CD+2DVD editions contained Kumi's Dream Music Park, which spanned for two days at Yokohama Stadium.

Promotional advertisements
"Okay" and "Aitakute" (逢いたくて / Want to See You) were both used to advertise Kracie's "Ichikami" (いち髪) shampoo range, which featured Kumi as the spokesperson for the surrounding marketing campaign. "Melting" was used as the theme song to Sogo & Seibu's "Winter City" promotional campaign. "Winter City" is an annual winter promotion done by Sogo & Seibu for the final week in December to help sell their stock of winter merchandise.

"Hey baby!" was used as the opening song for popular anime Crayon Shin-chan for its twelfth season. The anime was produced by Shin-Ei Animation, and was an adaptation of the manga created by Yoshito Usui. "Bambi" was used to advertise the online store 7net Shopping. Kumi had helped advertise the site in the past with her song "Lollipop."

Track listing
(Source)

Charts

Oricon Sales Chart (Japan)

Other charts

Release history

Alternate Versions
AT THE WEEKEND
AT THE WEEKEND: Found on the album (2011)
AT THE WEEKEND [Big Boy LA Weekend Remix]: Found on Koda Kumi Driving Hit's 5 (2013)

Melting
Melting: Found on the album (2011)
Metlting [DJ OMKT & MJ Remix]: Found on Koda Kumi Driving Hit's 4 (2012)

Hey baby!
Hey baby!: Found on the album (2011)
Hey baby! [FUTURE HOUSE UNITED Remix]: Found on Beach Mix (2012)

References 

2011 albums
Koda Kumi albums
Avex Group albums
Avex Group video albums
Electropop video albums